The Gunfighters is a 1987 television Western film, starring Art Hindle and George Kennedy, directed by Clay Borris.

Plot
Three Everett men, brothers Cole (Art Hindle) and Matt (Tony Addabbo) and cousin Dutch (Reiner Schoene), are trying to make a go of their ranch in 1880s Kansas. Cole and Dutch are settled and pacifistic, but Matt is wild, idolizing Billy the Kid and spending his free time honing his gunfighting skills. The three men run afoul of the local cattle baron Deke Turner (George Kennedy), who has gained control of the local bank and has the local sheriff on his payroll, and seeks to acquire the Everett ranch.

Matt gets in a dispute over a woman with someone who works for Turner, and kills him in self-defense. Turner schemes to make it appear as murder, and Matt is forced to flee to Texas. A $500 bounty is immediately placed on his head, and Matt has to kill a man in a shoot-out to keep from being taken in. However he is caught soon after and is returned by train to Kansas to be hung.

Told the news, Cole and Dutch decide to break Matt out of custody. When they do so they all become wanted outlaws. In freeing Matt they enabled another outlaw to get away. He invites the three Everett men to join up with his gang. Without any other good options, they accept. They intend to get back at Turner by robbing him of his holdings all over the state. However the gang they joined up with is more violent than they at first believed, and, in addition, the Pinkerton agency has been hired to track them down.

Cast

Reception 
The film, as of March 2016, holds a 0% rating with critics not critiquing and the audience rates the program as 67% favorable on Rotten Tomatoes.

References

External links
 The Gunfighters at IMDB
 The Gunfighters (1987) at Rotten Tomatoes
 The Gunfighters at OV Guide.com

1987 films
American Western (genre) television films
1987 Western (genre) films
1980s English-language films
Films directed by Clay Borris
1980s American films